The 2013 Stock Car Brasil season was the 35th Stock Car Brasil season. It began on March 3 at the Interlagos and ended on December 15 at the same circuit, after twelve rounds. Pirelli return to the championship after a five-season absence, replacing Goodyear as tyre supplier.

Teams and drivers
All drivers were Brazilian-registered.

Team changes
 William Lube and Andreas Mattheis owners of Shell Racing-WA Mattheis ended the partnership. Mattheis began sharing the team's command with his son Rodolhpo Mattheis and changed its official name to R.Mattheis Motorsport, but, sponsor's reasons continue to like Shell Racing. Lube alongside Cimed Group purchased the JF Racing and created a new team Voxx Racing.
 Pharmaceutical company Cimed forms a new team by buying the JF team. They recruited drivers Sérgio Jimenez and Denis Navarro.
 After three seasons of partnership, Boettger Competições and Itaipava broke up. Boettger will revert to using its original name in 2013.
 Gramacho Competições will return for the championship after two seasons.
 Textiles Hanier and racing driver Beto Cavaleiro purchased the cars of FTS Competições, who called BMC Racing in 2012 and created Hanier Racing. The team will switch from entering a Chevrolet to the Peugeot for its 2013 campaign. BMC group continues in the championship in partner with RZ Motorsport.
 After racing as "Medley Full Time" in 2011 and 2012, Full Time Sports will revert to using its original name in 2013. The team will move from Chevrolet in 2013.
 RCM Motorsport competing under the name Ipiranga-RCM. Due sponsor reasons.
Due to sponsorship reasons, Carlos Alves Competições was renamed to the Shin Racing Team.

Driver changes
 Rubens Barrichello, who competed in the last three races of the 2012 season for Medley Full Time, stayed for the full season in 2013, driving for Full Time Sports.
 Pedro Boesel and Antônio Pizzonia lost their seats after Comprafacil Nascar JF withdrew from the championship.
 Popó Bueno left Linea Sucrolose to join Shell Racing.
 Júlio Campos moved from Carlos Alves Competições to Prati-Donaduzzi.
 Claudio Capparelli, Fabio Carbone, Hélio Castroneves, Rafael Daniel, Diego Freitas, Bruno Junqueira, Tony Kanaan, Giuliano Losacco, Felipe Maluhy, Rodrigo Navarro, Pedro Nunes, Diogo Pachenki, Cláudio Ricci and Matheus Stumpf, who competed part-time or as a guest in 2012, did not return for the championship in 2013.
 Beto Cavaleiro entered in the Stock Car Brasil with newcoming team Hanier Racing.
 Alceu Feldmann was suspended with twenty-four months for doping in 2012, but the sentence was reduced for nine months and Feldmann signed with Full Time Sports.
 Fábio Fogaça, who competed in 2012 Stock Car Corrida do Milhão, raced with Vogel Motorsport in 2013.
 Vitor Genz made his debut in Stock Car Brasil with Gramacho Competições.
 After six months of suspension for doping, Marcos Gomes moved to Carlos Alves Competições for the 2013 season.
 Patrick Gonçalves, who competed part-time in 2012, moved to RC3 Bassani in 2013.
 Sérgio Jimenez, who was third place in the 2012 Brazilian GT Championship season joined Voxx Racing.
 Wellington Justino returned for the championship with Hot Car Competições.
 Lico Kaesemodel moved from RCM Motorsport to Boettger Competições.
 Felipe Lapenna made his debut in the category with Hanier Racing.
 Eduardo Leite lost his seat at Hot Car Competições.
 Raphael Matos, who competed part-time with Bassani Racing in 2012, joined Hot Car Competições in 2013.
 Vítor Meira lost his seat at Officer ProGP.
 David Muffato movee from Itaipava Racing Team to Carlos Alves Competições.
 Denis Navarro, who competed for Vogel Motorsport in 2012, moved to newcoming team Voxx Racing.
 Xandinho Negrão lost his seat at Medley Full Time.
 Diego Nunes movee from Hot Car Competições to RC3 Bassani.
 Galid Osman signed with Ipiranga-RCM after a season with BMC Racing.
 Rodrigo Pimenta, who was runner-up in the 2012 Stock Car Brasil second-tier, continued his association with Gramacho Competições.
 Tuka Rocha, who drove for FTS Competições-BMC Racing in 2012, moved to RZ Motorsport-BMC Racing for the 2013 season.
 Ricardo Sperafico moved from Prati-Donaduzzi Racing to Officer ProGP.

Mid-season changes
 IndyCar Series driver Hélio Castroneves was supposed to participate in the seventh round at Ribeirão Preto for Shell Racing but did not start. In 2012 he competed in the last round of the season.
 Patrick Gonçalves did not return for RC3 Bassani after the fourth round at Salvador. Stock Car Brasil second tier driver Gabriel Casagrande replaced Gonçalves prior to the eighth round at Cascavel. After competing in Formula Renault 3.5, Lucas Foresti replaces Casagrande at Brasília, for his Stock Car début.
 FIA WEC Aston Martin Racing driver Bruno Senna competed as a guest in the Stock Car Brasil Million Race for Shell Racing-GT Team Raízen.

Race calendar and results
A twelve-round calendar was announced on 5 December 2012, with Brasília host two races and Goiânia receiving the category after eleven seasons. Londrina and Rio de Janeiro that the track was to be demolished  will not host a race in 2013. Also was confirmed the fifth edition of Stock Car Corrida do Milhão at last round of the season.

In July, the round of Goiânia was removed from the calendar, and replaced with a second race at Cascavel. The round scheduled to be held in Brasília was moved to November. All races were held in Brazil.

Championship standings
Points were awarded as follows:

Drivers' Championship

Teams' Championship

References

External links
 Official website of the Stock Car Brasil (in Portuguese)

Stock Car Brasil seasons
Stock Car Brasil season